Nerve Software, LLC is an American video game developer that was co-founded by ex-id Software employee Brandon James.  Many of the original employees at Nerve were previously employed by Rogue Entertainment, another U.S.-based software company.

Games

Assistant Developer

Ports

References

External links
 Nerve Software website
 Company profile at MobyGames

2001 establishments in Texas
Companies based in Richardson, Texas
Video game companies established in 2001
Video game companies of the United States
Video game development companies